Dženada Mešaljić (born 28 April 1997), known by her stage name Dada Mešaljić, is a Bosnian singer. She rose to fame as a contestant on Zvezde Granda and for covering various Indira Radić's songs.

Life and career
Mešaljić was born in Tuzla and raised in the nearby town Srebrenik. Dada gained recognition in the media and went on to enjoy popularity after appearing on music competitions such as Zvijezda možeš biti ti on Hayat TV, Valentino zvijezde on OTV and Zvezde Granda in 2016.

During her tour in America, Dada sang Indira Radić's song Zmaj at McDonald's in Florida. Her short performance went viral.

Dada cites Marija Šerifović as one of her biggest musical influences.

Discography

Singles
Sahara (2019)

References

External links
 
 
 
 

1997 births
Living people
Bosnia and Herzegovina  women singers
Grand Production artists